Richard C. Andrade is an American politician and a former Democratic member of the Arizona House of Representatives representing District 29 from 2015 to 2023. He served in the U.S. Air Force from 1983 to 1990.

Elections
 2014 Andrade and Ceci Velasquez defeated Steve Chapman and Denise Garcia in the Democratic primary. Andrade and Velasquez defeated Republican Borders in the general election.

References

External links
 Official page at the Arizona State Legislature
 Biography at Ballotpedia

Democratic Party members of the Arizona House of Representatives
Hispanic and Latino American state legislators in Arizona
Politicians from Phoenix, Arizona
Living people
Year of birth missing (living people)
21st-century American politicians